Tsul 'Kalu, is known as the Cherokee Devil, a legendary figure of Cherokee mythology that plays the role of "the great lord of the game," and as such is frequently invoked in hunting rites and rituals. The Tsul 'Kalu is also known as judaculla or slant-eyed giant  that married a young girl

Name etymology
The tale is one of the best known Cherokee legends and was recorded by Europeans as early as 1823, often using the spelling, Tuli cula. The name Tsul 'Kalu means literally "he has them slanting/sloping", is understood to refer to his eyes, although the word eye (akta, plural dikta) is not a part of it. In the plural form, it is also the name of a traditional race of giants in the far west.

In local nomenclature
He is said to dwell in a place called Tsunegun'yi. The words Tsul and Tsune and their variations appear in a number of Cherokee place names throughout the Southeastern United States, especially in western North Carolina and eastern Tennessee.

Tsul`kälû' Tsunegûñ'yï is a  patch on a slope of the mountain Tanasee Bald in Jackson County, North Carolina, on the ridge upon which the boundary of Haywood, Jackson, and Transylvania Counties converge. It is believed Tsul 'Kalu was responsible for clearing the spot for his residence. The name is sometimes corrupted by Europeans to Jutaculla; consequently the area is also known as the "Jutaculla Old Fields". There is also a large slab of soapstone called "Jutaculla Rock" nearby, which is covered with strange scratches and carvings. These markings are said to have been made by the giant when he would jump from his home on the mountain to the creek below.

Another place associated with Tsul 'Kalu, Tsula'sinun'yi (literally "where the footprint is"), is located on the Tuckasegee River, about a mile above Deep Creek in Swain County, North Carolina. Impressions said to have been the footprints of the giant Tsul`kälû' and a deer was found on a rock that was destroyed during railroad building.

Popular culture
 Tsul 'Kalu appears in The Secret Saturdays episode "The Return of Tsul 'Kalu". It appears at the ruins close by The Saturdays' house where it attacks the Saturdays to retrieve his hand on Zak's staff. It was also responsible for leaving a scar on Solomon "Doc" Saturday's face and costing him the use of one of his eyes. Tsul 'Kalu later appears in the episode "And Your Enemies Closer" saving Zak from Argost and assisted by Doc, Fisk, and Komodo. 
 In the popular online game World of Warcraft, Tsul 'Kalu appears as a massive white gorilla in the zone known as "Northern Stranglethorn". Also known as "The Earth Spirit", he is neutral unless attacked and is often tamed by hunters for his unique appearance.
 In the book The Lost Hero by Rick Riordan, Tsul 'Kalu is mentioned by Piper McLean's father Tristan McLean after she, Jason Grace, and Leo Valdez rescue him from Enceladus, a Giant monster who Tristan McLean, a Cherokee, sees through the lens of Cherokee mythology, and the other Giants: "And the giant, Tsul'kälû, breathing fire--" (p. 472)
 In the film, "In The Devil's Courthouse," Tsul 'Kalu is referenced as Judaculla and is a ravenous creature that terrorizes a young woman, her brother, and a small group of friends in the Appalachian Mountains of Western North Carolina. Judaculla Rock is also referenced in the prologue of the film as a warning left by the Cherokee for all to see for eternity. "In The Devil's Courthouse" was released in 2011 by Brain Juice Productions of North Carolina.
 The Tsul 'Kalu appeared in the season finale of Mountain Monsters third season and is mentioned in the fourth season and is the second monster of the series to be a subject in three episodes, the first being the Yahoo and the Grassman.
Tsul'Kalu appears as the main antagonist in the novel "Flux" by Jeremy Robinson.

See also
 List of topics characterized as pseudoscience
 Judaculla Rock
 Bigfoot

References

External links
 The Full Version of the Tsul 'Kalu legend at www.firstpeople.us
 Local Legends Of North Carolina at www.sacred-texts.com

 Cherokee legendary creatures
 Giants